Ratha's Creature is a novel by Clare Bell. First published in 1983 by Atheneum-Argo, Margaret K. McElderry (hard-cover edition), the current edition was published in February 2011 by Imaginator Press.

This novel is the first in the Ratha series, also re-titled as The Books of the Named.

Plot 
Ratha and her people (the Named) are a clan of a strong, highly sapient, almost cheetah-like species of Dinaelurus nimravids. They have laws, languages, and traditions and live by herding some of the local prey creatures, such as anchitheriine equids called dapplebacks and protoceratids called three-horns (or tri-corns), they once hunted more ferally - though they still sometimes hunt prey they do not herd. Surrounding the Named are the more numerous not very sapient Un-Named, who occasionally prey on the Named clan’s herds. Mating between Named and Un-Named is forbidden, since the clan believes that the resulting young will always be born Un-Named.

Ratha, a young female of the Named, bucks the clan tradition of male dominance by training with the herding teacher, Thakur, to become a herder. All the herders are male except for Fessran, a strong-willed fully-grown female who became a herder before Meoran took over leadership. Attacks by the Un-Named are driving Ratha's clan close to the edge of survival. Only her discovery of how to tame fire (The "Red Tongue”) offers the clan a chance to survive.

Meoran, the tyrannical male clan leader, opposes Ratha because of her unusual partnership with fire and drives her out of the clan. In exile among the Un-Named, Ratha meets a lone male and truly discovers that the clan is wrong about some of the Un-Named - he speaks the language of the Named very well and is as bright as any Named clan member. She dubs him "Bonechewer". He teaches her new ways to hunt, the two mate and she has his young. When the cubs don’t develop according to her expectations, she realizes that they are probably not as sapient-minded as her. She flies into a rage, attacking Bonechewer, biting and crippling the female cub, Thistle-Chaser and abandoning her mate and the litter.

Returning to the clan at Thakur‘s bidding, Ratha reacquires her "creature”, the Red Tongue. With it, she overthrows and kills Meoran. When the Un-Named attack again, she, Thakur and Fessran lead the Named clan in striking back with a new weapon, fire. The enemy flees in terror. After the battle, Ratha emerges as clan leader. She makes Fessran chief of the Firekeepers, those who build and tend fire for the clan. The Firekeepers also wield torches in battle. Ratha gives The People of The Red Tongue each a torch, and they fight the Un-Named.

Ratha’s victory is bittersweet, however. Her mate, Bonechewer, was fatally injured in the fight and Ratha finds him dying. Despite everything, she still loves him and is wounded by his death. She is also troubled by the changes Red Tongue has made in her people. However, she knows that with the Red Tongue, the Named will survive.

Adaptations
An animated movie was made based on this book in the mid to late '80s for CBS Storybreak, a show similar to the ABC Weekend Special or After School Special, which created adaptations of modern and classic children's books. Clips are available on YouTube.

Sequels
Clan Ground
Ratha and Thistle-chaser
Ratha's Challenge
Ratha's Courage

References

External links 
 Author website: http://www.rathascourage.com

1983 American novels
1983 fantasy novels
American fantasy novels
Novels set in prehistory
Children's novels about animals
CBS Storybreak
Debut fantasy novels
1983 debut novels